Yam is  a staple food in West Africa and other regions classified as a Tuber crop and it is an annual or perennial crop. The New Yam festival is celebrated by almost every ethnic group in Nigeria and is observed annually at the end of June.

Essence of the New Yam Festival 
To fully understand the New Yam Festival we must first understand the reason why the festival is celebrated in almost every state, town and city in Nigeria.

History 
Historically, Yam is considered one of the major or the most important crops in Nigeria as it is grown in mostly all the states, and whoever in a community has a barn of Yam is listed among the wealthy sets of people in the community. Yam is counted to be more than just food. It is very well respected in Nigeria and is one of the major food accepted as bride price when a man is seeking for a woman's hand in marriage. The festival is mostly celebrated among the Igbo people due to different spiritual ideologies surrounding Yams, as told by ancestors through stories passed on until the current day. Yams are annual crops, although they are sometimes regarded as perennial crops due to their life cycle. Therefore, New Yam Festival is celebrated annually, after new yams are harvested  The festival holds yearly to celebrate the beginning and end of a new season. Also, it is said to be a taboo to eat the new Yam before the celebration as it is a means of pleasing and appealing to the gods and spirit of harvest and god of the Earth and thanking them for a bountiful harvest. By so doing, the gods will be happy and will bring a better harvest in the new season.

Nigerian peoples that celebrate New Yam Festival 
Igbo
Okpe Kingdom According to the Opke tradition as early as 6:30 am the inhabitants  of the land both indegines and non indigenes gather at the palace of the Olopke of Okpe to pay him homage and wish him and his family well wishes. it begins with a 13 days notice to the entire town  after deliberation between the King and his chiefs. The notice elapses at 5am on the thirteenth day. The festival is called Wasigbeenile, ‘Thank You For Taking Care Of Me. Strangers and women who had suffered still birth around that period are banned from attending the ceremony. The ritual kicks off officially after the king emerges from the inner chamber of his palace clad in an all white attire and joined his chief who are also dressed in all white attire. the king leads a procession with the chiefs amids drumming and dancing from the palace to the village square. The procession takes abouit 90 minutes to arrive the village square and a lengthy prayer is said for the wellbeign of all children of the land both home and abroad. the procession returns to the palace for a "pounded yam eating ceremony". The festival is an age old tradition and a way of thanking God for taking care of the people.
Abuja Yam Festival
Ife New Yam Festival. Harvesting of New Yam normally occurs during July and August of every year. The Oni of Ife Oba Adeye Enitan Ogunwusi 
Ekinrin-Adde Community
Ogidi Community

 Yoruba people, especially the Ekiti people, including:
Ado Ekiti
Ikere Ekiti
Ilara-Mokin.

Towns and their Conviviality

Okpe Kingdom New Yam Festival 
Okpe is a town located at Akoko-Edo local council in Edo state. The town is known for its vast celebration of the new yam festival, which holds every July in the town. At about thirteen days to the festival, Olokpe(the King) and his Chiefs who are the committee members for the festival notify the community about new improvements or deductions to the festival. After this, the King sends his greetings to the whole kingdom through the gunshots which are heard far and near by the people. The sounds carry the message ‘Wasigbeenile’, which means, ‘thank you all for taking good care of me in this outgoing year”. The people then greet themselves with this word throughout day.

On the first day of the ceremony, people visit the palace with gifts such as assorted bush meat, goats, yam tubers etc. as a mark of respect for the king's throne. On the main day, the King and his chiefs come out of the palace dressed in white attires. They visit four Shrines (called the Ancestral spots) to offer prayers and blessings for a better harvest and more productive years. The ceremony continues later at the town square with a speech to address the town issues given by the Olokpe as well as other guests and reputable individuals from the town.

Abuja City New Yam Festival 
Abuja, the Capital of Nigeria, lies in the central part of Nigeria, in Federal Capital Territory(FCT). During its New yam festival celebrations, which is celebrated with the Igbo festival, it is said that yam is one of the ways of measuring a mans wealth. During the festival, different types of yams are served to people with different sauce to celebrate.

Ekinrin-Adde New Yam Festival 
Ekinrin-Adde town is located in North eastern Nigeria, Kogi State specifically.

Ikere Ekiti New Yam Festival 
Ikere town is located in Ekiti State, South western Nigeria. where the yam festival is celebrated yearly. The festival is called Odun Ijesu in Yoruba Language (Festival of eating yam) and it is done to thank orisha for the fertility of the land and for crowning their efforts in the previous planting season.  The festival is a colorful one as the drums are rolled out with singers and dancers and prayers for the Ogoga, the King of the town, whom is known as the harbinger of good fortunes for Ikere, to enjoy a long reign and for the town to witness greater development. Many activities are held including hunting, gun firing and the display of all the crowns worn by the Oba. The Oba always dresses in traditional clothing known as Aso Oke with his white crown while the Oloris (King's wives) are adorned with various beads and they dance before the King.

Ogidi New Yam Festival 
Ogidi Community is located in Ijumu local government area of Kogi State. The town is known for the presence and formation of indigenous rocks. The town is popularly known for its agricultural produce, especially yams. In Ogidi, yams are considered miraculous plants that show fertility thus the period of plenty yam harvest signifies that other plants will flourish. All these culminates in the annual celebration of the Ogidi new yam festival. According to the people of Ogidi, new yam festival is celebrated to offer thanksgiving to God who gives increase and yield. It is celebrated in conjunction with the ogidi-Ela day which is the land's cultural day, which starts few days to the festival week. Different dance groups parade the community and hunters demonstrate gun firing to create awareness of the festivities in the community. The festival is celebrated for one week with several activities such as cultural performances, presentation of new yams, chieftaincy investitures and awards. Other activities are free medical checkups, novelty match, Jumat service, excursion to the Oroke Oda mountain and a bonfire. The colorful festival always attracts tourists from neighboring communities and states such as Edo, Ekiti, Osun, Lagos etc. The festival begins with members of the community marching to the Ogidi community ground where the ceremony takes place. People are adorned with beautiful attires that brighten the environment. The festival fully starts when the King, Rabiu Oladimeji Sule (the Ologidi of Ogidi land), arrives the venue. His presence creates a special atmosphere as the crowd raise their voices with cheer. When the Ologidi arrives, different groups are allowed to pay respect with the Olokoro/Olu-Otun group first then the Orotas and others follow. After the groups, everyone present follow to pay their respect. Also, Masquerade performances occur from the Igbabolelimin masquerade (masquerade from the spirit world), Egungun Oniye (masquerade with feathers), Igunnuko masquerade, Agbo Olode masquerade, as well as performance from the Geledes (humans wearing masks)  Various dishes  are shared during the festival so the people will remain active and lively.

Igbo community 
The Igbo people also known as the Ibos are from the southeastern part of Nigeria. They are one of the major people in Nigeria that celebrates the new yam festival. They hold the festival at the beginning of each harvest of new yam (Iri ji) or Onwa Asaa (seventh month). The purpose of the festival is to thank God for a bountiful harvest especially for the Yams and no one is expected to have a taste of the new yam before the festival as it is considered a taboo. The festival is very important to the ibos and is celebrated each year. The festival serve as a season where indigines of the town return home to re-unite themselves with their loved ones and enjoy together.

References 

Festivals in Nigeria